Hilary F. Mahaney Sr. (February 17, 1902 – August 30, 1969) was an American football player and coach and jurist. He played end for Holy Cross from 1921 to 1924, served as the head football coach at Boston University from 1930 to 1931, and was a judge in Maine from 1955 to 1965.

Early life
A native of Biddeford, Maine, Mahaney attended Thornton Academy, where he captained the school to a state football championship. He was a four-year starter and three-time all-conference selection for Holy Cross from 1921 to 1924. He was selected as an All-American end after his senior season of 1924. He served as team captain his senior season. He was also a member of the school's track team.

Coaching career
In 1925, Mahaney joined Charles Whelan's coaching staff at Boston University, where he also attended law school. He was retained when Edward N. Robinson and Reggie Brown took over the program in 1926. In 1930 he was promoted to head coach. He was let go after the 1931 season.

Legal career
Mahaney graduated from Boston University School of Law in 1928 and practiced law in Biddeford. In 1931 he was named city solicitor of Saco, Maine. In 1950 he was the Democratic nominee for mayor of Saco. From 1955 to 1965 he was a judge of the Saco municipal court. He died on August 30, 1969 in Saco.

Head coaching record

References

External links
 

1902 births
1969 deaths
American football ends
Boston University School of Law alumni
Boston University Terriers football coaches
Holy Cross Crusaders football players
Maine Democrats
Maine lawyers
Maine state court judges
Sportspeople from Biddeford, Maine
People from Saco, Maine
Players of American football from Maine
Thornton Academy alumni